The 2000 Tour Down Under was the second edition of the Tour Down Under stage race. It took place from 18 to 23 January in and around Adelaide, South Australia.

Participating teams

 Linda McCartney Racing Team
 UniSA–Australia
 
 
 United Water–AIS
 
 
 
 
 Sun-Smart–Mitsubishi

Route and stages

Final classification

References

Tour Down Under
Tour Down Under, 2000
Tour Down Under, 2000
2000 in Oceanian sport
Tour